Joseph Franz von Goez (28 February 1754 in Sibiu - 16 September 1815, Regensburg) was a lawyer, artist, illustrator and portraitist active in Vienna in the mid-18th century.  Goez is credited as having created the first graphic novel, with his authorship of Lenardo und Blandine: ein Melodram nach Bürger.  This was an illustrated story book of a play Goez had written and produced based on a poem by Gottfried August Bürger.

References 

Austrian artists
1754 births
1815 deaths
People from Sibiu